Walter Blattmann (June 23, 1920 – April 10, 2000) was an American gymnast. He competed in eight events at the 1952 Summer Olympics.

References

1920 births
2000 deaths
American male artistic gymnasts
Olympic gymnasts of the United States
Gymnasts at the 1952 Summer Olympics
Sportspeople from New Orleans